The Musée Fabre is a museum in the southern French city of Montpellier, capital of the Hérault département.

The museum was founded by François-Xavier Fabre, a Montpellier painter, in 1825. Beginning in 2003, the museum underwent a 61.2 million euro renovation, which was completed in January 2007. It is one of the main sights of Montpellier and close to the city's main square, the Place de la Comédie. The museum's national importance is recognised by it being classified as a Musée de France by the French Ministry of Culture.

History 
The town of Montpellier was given thirty paintings in 1802 which formed the basis of a modest municipal museum under the Empire, moving between various temporary sites. In 1825, the town council accepted a large donation of works from Fabre and the museum was installed in the refurbished Hôtel de Massillian, officially opened on 3 December 1828. Fabre's generosity led others to follow his example, notably Antoine Valedau who donated his collection of Dutch and Flemish masters to the city. On the death of Fabre in 1837, a legacy of more than a hundred pictures and drawings completed the collection.

In 1864, Jules Bonnet-Mel, an art collector from Pézenas, bequeathed 400 drawings and 28 paintings. In 1868, Alfred Bruyas gave the works from his private gallery to the city. He is credited with having moved the museum collection into the modern era. In 1870, Jules Canonge, from Nîmes, gave a collection of more than 350 drawings. A legacy of Bruyas of more than 200 works completed his gift in 1877.

In 1968, Mme  in accordance with the will of her husband, a diplomat and great bibliophile, gave to the city their hôtel particulier , along with its contents. The structure had been built under the Third Republic.

Around 2001, the Library moved out of the complex, freeing a sizeable area and offering the chance to carry out a major modernisation and enhancement of the building. This took four years and included a whole new wing. The building re-opened in February 2007.

Collection 
See also :Category:Paintings in the collection of the Musée Fabre.
On display are ceramics from Greece and the rest of Europe. Furthermore, the museum has a large collection of paintings from the 17th until the 19th century, with a large representation of the luminophiles movement. There is also sculpture.

Painting from 15th to 18th century 

Some of the well-known painters featured in the museum:

French :
 Jacques-Louis David 5 paintings including Hector, Portrait of Doctor Alphonse Leroy
 Alexandre Cabanel
 Sébastien Bourdon
 Nicolas Poussin (Venus and Adonis)
 Simon Vouet
 Gaspard Dughet
 Charles Le Brun
 Nicolas de Largillière
 Hyacinthe Rigaud
 Jean-Baptiste Oudry
 Carle Van Loo
 Claude Joseph Vernet
 Jean-Baptiste Greuze : 9 paintings including Le Petit Paresseux, Twelfth Night Cake
 Hubert Robert

Outside France :
Italy :
 Jacopo Bassano
 Paolo Veronese
 Annibale Carracci
 Alessandro Allori : 3 paintings including Venus and Cupid
 Federico Zuccari
 Bernini
 Il Guercino : 2 paintings
 Domenichino : 2 paintings
 Salvator Rosa
 Luca Giordano
 Mattia Preti
 Francesco Guardi
 Giovanni Pannini
Flanders and Holland :
 Pieter Brueghel the Younger : 2 paintings
 Peter Paul Rubens : 3 paintings
 Jacob Isaakszoon van Ruisdael : 3 paintings
 Gerrit Dou
 Gabriel Metsu : 2 paintings
 Frans van Mieris the Elder : Young Woman Stringing Pearls
 Gerard ter Borch
 Jan Steen : 2 paintings
 Adriaen van Ostade
 David Teniers the Younger : 8 paintings
 Spain :
 Francisco Zurbarán : 2 paintings including The Angel Gabriel
 Jusepe Ribera
Other :
 Anton Raphael Mengs
 Joshua Reynolds

Painting from the 19th and 20th century, with a number of Fauvist painters 
 Frédéric Bazille (Vue de village, Aigues-Mortes, La Toilette, Atelier de la rue Furstenberg)
 François-Léon Benouville (The Wrath of Achilles)
 Gustave Courbet 15 paintings including The Bathers or Les Baigneuses, Bonjour Monsieur Courbet
 Eugène Delacroix (Fantasia, Algerian women in their room)
 Kees van Dongen (Portrait of Fernande Olivier)
 Raoul Dufy
 Jean Hugo
 Albert Marquet
 Pierre Soulages
 Nicolas de Staël
 Claude Viallat
 Maria Helena Vieira da Silva

Sculpture
 Antoine Bourdelle
 Jean-Antoine Houdon (Summer, Winter)
 René Iché
 Aristide Maillol
 Germaine Richier

See also
 List of Jesuit sites

References

External links

Official Musée Fabre (Agglomération de Montpellier) website—

Fabre
Buildings and structures in Montpellier
Museums in Hérault
Fabre
Art museums established in 1828
1828 establishments in France
Tourist attractions in Montpellier